Ernesto Aguirre may refer to:

 Ernesto Aguirre (footballer) (born 1963), Peruvian international footballer
 Ernesto Aguirre (tennis), Chilean Davis Cup tennis player